The Lago Alberto Assembly was a Chrysler Corporation automobile factory in the Nuevo Polanco district of Miguel Hidalgo borough, in northwestern Mexico City, Mexico. It was built during the 1930s and built Dodge trucks and the Plymouth Savoy.

The factory was idled in 2002, with production shifted to the Saltillo Truck Assembly.

It was demolished, and is the present day site of the Parques Polanco project, a mixed-use development.

See also

 

Chrysler factories
Former motor vehicle assembly plants
Demolished buildings and structures in Mexico
Buildings and structures in Mexico City
Miguel Hidalgo, Mexico City
Motor vehicle assembly plants in Mexico
2002 disestablishments in Mexico
Manufacturing companies disestablished in 2002